The Battle of Koniecpol was an encounter in November 1708 during the Great Northern War.

History 
Near Koniecpol in the Polish–Lithuanian Commonwealth, pro-Swedish forces under Stanisław Leszczyński met with anti-Swedish forces of the Sandomierz Confederation, loyal to Augustus the Strong and allied with Russia. Both armies had a strength of about 10,000 men. Leszczyński was defeated, and thus unable to aid Charles XII of Sweden in the Russian campaign.

References

Koniecpol
History of Silesian Voivodeship
Koniecpol
1708 in Europe
1708 in the Polish–Lithuanian Commonwealth